Martin Bauer (born 30 December 1975 in Mödling) is an Austrian former motorcycle racer.

In  he raced as a wildcard in MotoGP, riding a Suter-BMW for Remus Racing Team in the Czech Republic Grand Prix, finishing 21st, and in the Valencian Community Grand Prix, finishing 20th, one lap down in both occasions. He was the first Austrian to race in the premier class of Grands Prix since Andreas Meklau in the  500cc season.

Career statistics

Grand Prix motorcycle racing

By season

Races by year
(key)

Superbike World Championship

Races by year

References

External links
MotoGP.com rider profile
WorldSBK.com rider profile

Austrian motorcycle racers
People from Mödling
FIM Superstock 1000 Cup riders
Superbike World Championship riders
MotoGP World Championship riders
1975 births
Living people
Sportspeople from Lower Austria